Pinnacles National Forest was a  United States National Forest in California. It became a national forest on March 4, 1907 when all U.S. national forest reserves were redesignated as national forests by act of U.S. Congress. On July 1, 1908, Pinnacles was added to Monterey National Forest by executive order,  and the name was discontinued. The lands currently exist in Los Padres National Forest and in Pinnacles National Park, proclaimed as Pinnacles National Monument by Theodore Roosevelt in 1908.

References

External links
 Listing of the National Forests of the United States and Their Dates (from the Forest History Society website) Text from Davis, Richard C., ed. Encyclopedia of American Forest and Conservation History. New York: Macmillan Publishing Company for the Forest History Society, 1983. Vol. II, pp. 743-788.

Former National Forests of California
Pinnacles National Park